Gheorghe Anton (born 27 January 1993) is a Moldovan footballer who plays as a midfielder. In his career, Anton also played for teams such as Zimbru Chișinău, Sheriff Tiraspol or SCM Gloria Buzău.

Career

Club
On 25 January 2020, Anton signed for Zira FK on an 18-month contract.

National team

International stats

Honours
Zimbru Chișinău
Moldovan Cup (1): 2013–14
Moldovan Super Cup (1): 2014

Sheriff Tiraspol
Divizia Națională (3): 2017, 2018, 2019
Moldovan Cup (1): 2018–19

Notes

References

External links
Gheorghe Anton at Zimbru website

1993 births
Living people
People from Telenești District
Moldovan footballers
Moldova international footballers
Association football midfielders
Moldovan Super Liga players
FC Zimbru Chișinău players
FC Sheriff Tiraspol players
Azerbaijan Premier League players
Zira FK players
Liga II players
FC Gloria Buzău players
FC Brașov (2021) players
Moldovan expatriate footballers
Moldovan expatriate sportspeople in Azerbaijan
Expatriate footballers in Azerbaijan
Moldovan expatriate sportspeople in Romania
Expatriate footballers in Romania